The Institute of Folklore in Azerbaijan is an independent institute, which started its activity in 1994 on the base of the Azerbaijan National Academy of Sciences (ANAS). The main target of the institute is collecting and investigating Azerbaijani folklore samples.

History

The 1920s 
In the 1920s the scientific organization of folklore in Azerbaijan acted within the Organization of Investigation and Studying of Azerbaijan (OISA). Folklorist Hanafi Zeynalli was the head of Folklore Commission during the years of 1923-1929. He was also the head of the Oral Literature section created within the Transcaucasian Branch of Scientific Academy of USSR. In 1935 Azerbaijan Branch of Scientific Academy of USSR launched and on the base of the same branch the Folklore section created, which headed by Hanafi Zeynalli, Z. Zakirov and later A. Avadyayev. The period of 1920-1930 was productive with collection, investigation, and publication of Azerbaijani folklore. Azerbaijan State Scientific Investigation Institute established on the base of the OISA in 1929. Within the institute created the Department of Folklore of Language, Literature, and Art headed by Veli Khuluflu. Baba Asgerov was head of the Folklore section in that period.

Repression 
Repression in 1937 influenced the work of Institute of Folklore as the rest of spheres in Azerbaijan. Folklorists Hanafi Zeynalli, Vali Khuluflu, S.Mumtaz, A.Abid, H.Alizade, and others were the victims of repression. From 1939 Folklore section continued its activity on the base of the Institute of Literature named after Nizami Ganjavi headed by national folklorists such as Israfil Abbasli and Mammadhuseyn Tahmasib.

1980-1990 years 
That period followed by democratic activities of Folklore Institute and creation of the department of Mythology headed by professor M.Seyidov. After gaining state independence increased the importance of comprehensive investigation of folklore samples and followed by new scientific projects. The Scientific-Cultural Center “Palace of Folklore” created within the Institute of Literature in 1994 and the individual building of the center is situated in Icharishahar (Old City), Baku. Huseyn Ismayilov was appointed as an executor director of the Scientific-Cultural Center “Palace of Folklore” in the ANAS Institute of Literature named after Nizami in 1995.

The 2000s 
The Scientific-Cultural Center continued its activity as an independent structural unit of Azerbaijan National Scientific Academy in 2003 and led by H.Ismayilov until 2011. Several structure units created such as Azerbaijan folklore, Korkut-study, Ashik activity, Folklore of Turkic nations, Theory of folklore, Mythology, Editorial-publishing department, Folklore laboratory, Scientific archive, Shaki section and “Irs” folklore group within the Institute of Folklore after becoming an independent unit. During the years 2005-2007 established Ashik music department and Qazakh-Borchali and Foreign Relations sections were created. The department of Ashik music became a scientific-investigation department in 2007.

The institute was led by Mukhtar Imanov from 2011. After 2010s institute expanded its structure by creating several departments such as, the department of Classic folklore, department of folklore of Turkic nations, department of Dede Korkut, department of Ashik activity, department of Mythology, department of Southern Azerbaijan, department of Modern folklore, department of Ceremony folklore, department of Folklore and written literature, department of Collecting and systemizing of folklore, department of music folklore, Folklore fund, section of Folklore of limited nations, section of Foreign relations, section of Editorial-publication, folklore ensemble “Irs” and Folklore studio.

In 2012 ANAS Institute of Folklore became a member of Caucasian universities combines approximately 40 scientific-educational and scientific-investigation institutes of Caucasus and Anatolia.

The Structure of Institute

Scientific Council of Institute 
Council is the main decision-making structure of the institute. The main issues discussed in council are an affirmation of the scientific-investigation plans and accounts, publication of scientific researches and folklore collections, an organization of scientific conferences and meetings.

Department of Classic folklore 
During 2003-2013 the department was called Azerbaijan folklore headed by Israfil Abbasli. The goal of the department is researching traditional Azerbaijani folklore, studying the local, regional, ethnic and universal connections and investigating theoretical problems of folklore-study. From 2013 Classic folklore department has been leading by Rza Khalilov.

Department of the folklore of Turkic nations 
This department started its activity from 2003 in order to research Azerbaijani folklore in a common Turkic context. Furthermore, department of the folklore of Turkic nations carries out investigations of folklore samples of Turkic nations, analyses folklore monuments, common Turkic folklore texts, translations and publication of folklore examples. During the process of investigation, the department explores connections between nations and find out the problems relating to the folklore of various Turkic nations. Afzaladdin Asgerov is the head of the department.

Department of Dede Korkut 
In the early years, the department called “Korkut study”, which established in 2000 dedicated to the 1300th anniversary of “Book of Dede Korkut”. From 2011 the department started to act as “Dede Korkut”. This department carries out analysis of “Book of Dede Korkut” and other ancient Turkic eposes. On the base of these analyses department periodically publishes the scientific journal called “Dede Korkut”. The head of the department is Tofig Hajiyev.

Department of Ashik activity 
The department was established in 2001 and from the year of 2003 acts as a department on the base of the Institute of folklore. Main responsibilities of the department are collecting and publishing the artistic examples of ashiks, writing monographic investigations on the base of the research of genesis and typology of Azerbaijan ashik activity. Moreover, the department preserves and carries out developing activities of ashik art. Elkhan Mammadli is the head of the department.

Department of Mythology 
In 2003 this department was established as an independent unit on the base of the Institute of Folklore. It has a various scale of working area such as collecting mythological texts of the country, classifying and defining their historical-cultural roots, carrying out diachronic structure study of the myth, researching problems relating to the myth-folklore structure levels and studying the morphological typology of myth. Besides, the department of Mythology investigates mythological samples on Turkic context and defines problems regarding to the Turkic national thinking texts. According to the investigations, department explores the impact of the Turkic mythological style to the structure creation of Azerbaijan national style. The head of the department is assistant professor Seyfeddin Rzayev.

Department of Southern Azerbaijan 
The department started its activity in 2013 in order to collect, investigate the Southern Azerbaijan folklore. On the base of the investigations, department deals with the publication, preserving Southern Azerbaijan folklore samples and defining their problems as scientific themes. The doctor of philosophy on philology Matanat Abbasova leads the department.

Department of Modern folklore 
The department of Modern folklore was created in order to investigate Azerbaijani in a modern context and define modern folk thinking in contemporary times. Moreover, it researches newly created folklore genres in modern urbanization period. The department is established in 2011 and led by Fuzuli Gozalov.

Department of Ceremony folklore 
The department acts from 2011 and carries out researching and collecting of folk ceremonies, performances, plays, and rituals. Besides, this department is responsible for investigations of folk information, beliefs, ritual elements, traditional holidays and ethics of the country. The head of the department is assistant professor Agaverdi Khalilov.

Department of Folklore and written literature 
The department started its activity in 2011. The main directions of the department are investigating problems regarding to the folklore and written literature, usage problems of written folklore and mythology. According to the investigations, the department publishes scientific articles about the classic literature of Azerbaijan. Professor Kamran Aliyev leads the department of Folklore and written literature.

Department of Collecting and systematizing of folklore 
The department acts from 2011. The main responsibilities of the department are collecting folklore samples from the different regions of the country and systematizing them according to the genres. Regarding to the collections the department arranges preservation and publication of the folklore materials. Fariz Rustamzade is the head of the department.

Department of Music folklore 
The Department of Music folklore was created in 2011 and joined to Ashik art and saz mastery. Naila Rahimbayli leads the department. The main action spheres of the department are assembling ancient folk musics and Ashik musics and restoring them. At the same time, the department analyses mugham art and defines theoretical classification regarding to the investigations.

Folklore fund 
The fund is also known as a scientific archive and deals with the collection and preservation of all folklore materials, which assembled by the departments. Approximately thousands of folklore materials have been collected during the active period of the scientific fund from 1995. Since 2009 the scientific fund has been leading by Guller Galandarli.

References 

Azerbaijani folklore
1994 establishments in Azerbaijan